Pe, also spelled Pai, is a minor Plateau language of Nigeria. It has been classified in various branches of Plateau, but is now seen to be Tarokoid (Blench 2008).

Pe villages are located southeast of Pankshin town. They are: Dok (Dokpai) (main village), Tipap Kwi, Tipap Re, Bwer, Kup (=Tiniŋ), Ban, Kwasam, and Kamcik. Other villages that linguist Roger Blench considers to be unconfirmed are Yong, Jak, Bil, Bwai, Wopti, Kanchi, and Yuwan.

References

Further reading
A Sociolinguistic Profile of the Pye (Pe) [pai] Language of Plateau State, Nigeria

Tarokoid languages
Languages of Nigeria